Lindsay Phillip Butterfield (1869–1948) was a British textile and wallpaper designer. According to the V&A, he was "one of the most successful freelance designers of patterns who worked in the Arts and Crafts style."

He trained at Lambeth School of Art in 1887 to 1888, then  briefly studied architecture under his cousin Philip Johnstone, before spending three years at the National Art Training School in South Kensington, London.

His uncle was the London church architect William Butterfield (1814-1900), and his godfather was John Belcher, also an architect.

In 1922, he published Floral forms in historic design for B. T. Batsford Ltd.

In 1930, he was a founder member of the Society of Industrial Designers, now the Chartered Society of Designers.

His work is in the permanent collection of the Victoria and Albert Museum, London.

References

1869 births
1948 deaths
British textile designers
Alumni of the Royal College of Art